List of bus companies of Norway including current, scheduled operators by county. Does not include companies only operating on charter or school buses.

Agder
Administrator: Agder Kollektivtrafikk
Agder Buss
Boreal Buss
Setesdal Bilruter
Sørlandsruta

Innlandet
Administrator: Innlandstrafikk
Etnedal Bilruter
Lesja Bilruter
Ringebu Bilruter
Snertingdal Auto
Torpa Bilruter
TrønderBilene
Unibuss
Vy Buss

Møre og Romsdal
Administrator: Fram
Boreal Buss                 
Tide Buss
Veøy Buss
Vy Buss

Nordland
Administrator: Nordland county municipality
Boreal Buss
Nordlandsbuss
Torghatten Buss

Oslo
Administrator: Ruter
Nobina Norge
Norgesbuss
Unibuss
Vy Buss

Troms og Finnmark
Administrator: Troms fylkestrafikk, Snelandia (Finnmark)
Boreal Buss
Nobina Norge
Tide Buss
Torghatten Buss

Trøndelag
Administrator: AtB
Boreal Buss
Tide Buss
TrønderBilene
Vy Buss

Vestfold og Telemark
Administrator: Vestfold Kollektivtrafikk, Farte (Telemark)
Tide Buss
Unibuss
Vy Buss

Vestland
Administrator: Kringom (Sogn og Fjordane), Skyss (Hordaland)
Firda Billag Buss
Modalen–Eksingedalen Billag
Tide Buss
Vy Buss

Viken
Administrators: Brakar (Buskerud), Ruter (Akershus), Østfold Kollektivtrafikk
Norgesbuss
Nobina Norge
Schaus Buss
Unibuss
Vy Buss

Intercity coach operators
Eskelisen Lapin Linjat, only operates routes from Finland to Tromsø and North Cape in the summer months
Jotunheimen og Valdresruten Bilselskap 
Telemark Bilruter

Intercity coach services
Flybussen (airport express coaches to/from some major airports, routes are operated by several companies)
NOR-WAY Bussekspress (routes are operated by several companies)
Vy bus4you
Vy express

 
Norway
Bus
Bus companies